Andis (also Romanized as Andīs; also known as Hendes, Hendīs, Hindis, and Īndes) is a village in Qareh Chay Rural District, in the Central District of Saveh County, Markazi Province, Iran. At the 2006 census, its population was 489, in 139 families.

References 

Populated places in Saveh County